Starina is a rural locality (a village) in Kemskoye Rural Settlement, Nikolsky District, Vologda Oblast, Russia. The population was 77 as of 2002.

Geography 
Starina is located 60 km west of Nikolsk (the district's administrative centre) by road. Kostylevo is the nearest rural locality.

References 

Rural localities in Nikolsky District, Vologda Oblast